45th National Board of Review Awards
December 24, 1973
The 45th National Board of Review Awards were announced on December 24, 1973.

Top Ten Films 
The Sting
Paper Moon
Bang the Drum Slowly
Serpico
O Lucky Man!
The Last American Hero
The Hireling
The Day of the Dolphin
The Way We Were
The Homecoming

Top Foreign Films 
Cries and Whispers
Day for Night
The New Land
The Tall Blond Man with One Black Shoe
Alfredo, Alfredo
Trafic

Winners 
Best Film:
The Sting
Best Foreign Film:
Cries and Whispers
Best Actor:
Al Pacino — Serpico
Robert Ryan — The Iceman Cometh
Best Actress:
Liv Ullmann — The New Land
Best Supporting Actor:
John Houseman — The Paper Chase
Best Supporting Actress:
Sylvia Sidney — Summer Wishes, Winter Dreams
Best Director:
Ingmar Bergman — Cries and Whispers

External links 
National Board of Review of Motion Pictures :: Awards for 1973

1973
1973 film awards
1973 in American cinema